Timothy or Tim O'Neill or O'Neal may refer to:

Timothy O'Neill (Daria), a character in the U.S. TV series Daria
Timothy O'Neill (soccer) (born 1982), American soccer midfielder
Tim O'Neill (Canadian football) (born 1979), Canadian football offensive lineman in the Canadian Football League
Tim O'Neill (seaQuest), character from the 1990s television series seaQuest DSV
Timothy O'Neal (golfer) (born 1972), American golfer
Timothy O'Neill (camoufleur) (born 1943), American camouflage expert, designer of MARPAT
Tim O'Neal (politician), member of the Pennsylvania House of Representatives

See also
Tim O'Neil, an American rally racing driver